McCall Glacier is located in the Goat Rocks region in the U.S. state of Washington. Consisting of numerous small bodies of ice, the largest section of McCall Glacier is immediately east of Ives Peak.

See also
List of glaciers in the United States

References

Glaciers of the Goat Rocks
Gifford Pinchot National Forest
Glaciers of Washington (state)